The Lower Arroyo Seco Historic District is a residential historic district in Pasadena, California. The historic district encompasses homes located near the lower Arroyo Seco along Arroyo Boulevard, California Boulevard, La Loma Road, and Grand Avenue. The district includes 78 contributing homes, the majority of which were influenced by the Arts and Crafts movement. During the early twentieth century, when most of the homes in the district were constructed, Pasadena was one of three prominent centers of American Craftsman design, along with Chicago and the San Francisco Bay Area. The district includes a variety of Craftsman designs only matched by one other area in California, a hilly neighborhood in Berkeley. Several prominent architects, including Charles K. Sumner and Henry Mather Greene, designed homes in the district. The Batchelder House, home of tile designer Ernest Batchelder, is included in the district.

The district was added to the National Register of Historic Places on July 12, 2005.

References

Houses on the National Register of Historic Places in California
National Register of Historic Places in Pasadena, California
Buildings and structures on the National Register of Historic Places in Pasadena, California
American Craftsman architecture in California
Houses in Pasadena, California
Historic districts on the National Register of Historic Places in California